In enzymology, a scymnol sulfotransferase is an enzyme that catalyzes the chemical reaction

3'-Phosphoadenosine-5'-phosphosulfate + 5beta-scymnol  adenosine 3',5'-bisphosphate + 5beta-scymnol sulfate

Thus, the two substrates of this enzyme are 3'-Phosphoadenosine-5'-phosphosulfate and 5beta-scymnol, whereas its two products are adenosine 3',5'-bisphosphate and 5beta-scymnol sulfate.

This enzyme belongs to the family of transferases, specifically the sulfotransferases, which transfer sulfur-containing groups.  The systematic name of this enzyme class is 3'-Phosphoadenosine-5'-phosphosulfate:5beta-scymnol sulfotransferase.

References

 
 
 
 

EC 2.8.2
Enzymes of unknown structure